PLSI may refer to:

Probabilistic latent semantic indexing, statistical technique for the analysis of two-mode and co-occurrence data
People's Linguistic Survey of India, linguistic survey to update existing knowledge about the languages spoken in India